Back of Beyond is a 1995 Australian film.

According to Ozmovies:
"The film was released in Sydney and Melbourne on 2nd November 1995, but quickly disappeared."

It was released on VHS in Australia and laserdisc in the United States but is now very difficult to find.

Plot

Reclusive mechanic, Tom McGregor operates a garage in the outback. Tom’s quiet existence is disturbed by the arrival of a group of thugs, lead by the psychopathic Connor, when their car breaks down. The gang, who are on the run from the law are  hoping  to stash some stolen diamonds, but things go pear-shaped when Connor's girlfriend Charlie becomes attracted to Tom.

Cast

 Paul Mercurio as Tom McGregor
 Dee Smart as Charlie
 Colin Friels as Connor
 Rebekah Elmaloglou as Susan McGregor
 John Polson as Nick
 Bob Maza as Gilbert
 Terry Serio as Lucky Dave
 Aaron Wilton as Ned
 Amy Miller-Porter as Rosie
 Glenda Linscott as Mary Margaret

References

External links

Back of Beyond (1995) at Ozmovies

Australian thriller films
1995 thriller films
1990s English-language films
1990s Australian films